This is a list of government-owned companies of Ethiopia. A Government-owned corporation is a legal entity that undertakes commercial activities on behalf of an owner government. There is no standard definition of a government-owned corporation (GOC) or state-owned enterprise (SOE), although the two terms can be used interchangeably. The defining characteristics are that they have a distinct legal shape and they are established to operate in commercial affairs. While they may also have public policy objectives, GOCs should be differentiated from other forms of government agencies or state entities established to pursue purely non-financial objectives.

Government-owned companies of Ethiopia 

Ethiopian Construction Design and Supervision Works Corporation
Ethiopian Agricultural Businesses Corporation
Ethio-Telecom 
Gumaro Tea Development Enterprise
Industrial Parks Development Corporation 
Ethiopian Grain trade Enterprise
Ethiopian Railway Corporation
Sugar Corporation
Metal and Engineering Corporation 
Commercial Bank of Ethiopia
Development Bank of Ethiopia 
Ethiopian Electric Utility 
Ethiopian Electric Power 
Ethiopian Airlines Group
Water Works
Design and Supervision Enterprise
Ethiopian water works construction 
Ethiopian shipping and logistic service 
Ethiopian Insurance corporation 
Chemical Industries Corporation 
Birhanena Selam printing enterprise
Hotels Development S.C(A.A. Hilton)
Adola Mine Enterprise
Ethiopian Tourist Trading enterprise
Spa Service Enterprise
Ghion Hotels Enterprises
National Alcohol and Liquor Factory 
Ethiopian Pulp and Paper S.C. 
Ethiopian Postal Service Enterprise
Ethiopian Trading Business Enterprise
Ethiopian Mineral, petroleum and Bio-fuel corporation
Shebele Transport Share company 
Ethiopian public service employees transport enterprise
Land bank and development corporation
Ethiopians Toll roads enterprises 
Caustic Soda S.C.
Awash Melkasa Aluminum Sulfate and Sulfuric Acid S.C
Adamitulu Pesticide processing S.C
Awassa Agricultural Development Enterprise 
Assala Malt Factory 
Building materials supply enterprise  
Industrial inputs development enterprise 
Defense construction materials manufacturing enterprise 
Defense construction enterprises 
Ethiopian Agricultural Commodities Warehousing
Service Enterprise
Ethiopian Construction Works Corporation
Federal Housing Corporation
Dry Port Service Enterprise
The ethio-Djibouti standard Gauge railway transport S.C
The Educational Materials Production and Distribution Enterprise
Ethiopian Conformity assessment Enterprise

See also

 List of government-owned companies
 Lists of companies (category)
 State ownership

References

 
Government-owned
Ethiopia